Ramil Idris oglu Usubov (born 1948) is the incumbent Secretary of the Security Council of Azerbaijan. Before he served as the Minister of Internal Affairs of Azerbaijan, in office from 1994–2019.

Early life 
Usubov was born in 1948 in Khojali Rayon of Azerbaijan. In 1970, he completed special school of Militsia named after N. Rzayev in Baku and graduated from Academy of Internal Affairs of USSR in 1980. Then he served in the Soviet Army and starting from 1970 worked in the law enforcement. Usubov is married and has three children.

Career 
He worked in criminal investigation units and in 1975 was appointed the head of Criminal Investigation Department of Shusha Rayon of Azerbaijan.  In 1980-1984, he served as the deputy chief of Internal Affairs Department of Nagorno Karabakh Autonomous Oblast of Azerbaijan. In 1984-1987, he was the chief of Ali Bayramli department of Internal Affairs. In 1987, Usubov was appointed Minister of Internal Affairs of Nakhichevan and from 1989 up until 1993, worked as the Chief of Criminal Investigation, Head of Department of Visas and Registration (OVIR) and Chief of Human Resources of Ministry of Internal Affairs of Azerbaijan.

Minister of Internal Affairs 
On August 11, 1993, he was appointed as the Minister of Internal Affairs of Nakhichevan Autonomous Republic, and on April 29, 1994, he was appointed as Minister of Internal Affairs of Azerbaijan by Presidential decree No. 140. During a Victory Day event in Baku in 2000, President Heydar Aliyev dismissed rumors about Usubov's potential dismissal, saying that "General Ramil Usubov is a very valuable man and works well" while praising his work.

In 2009, he filed a libel suit against activist Leyla Yunus after she alleged that police officers had been involved in human trafficking of young girls. He demanded 100,000 manat in damages. Human Rights Watch protested the trial, stating that "a judgment against Yunus would set a terrible precedent for freedom of expression in Azerbaijan", while other international groups described the case as "one more example of the Azerbaijani government cracking down on free expression".

Secretary of the Security Council 
By order of President Ilham Aliyev, on June 20, 2019, Usubov was appointed Secretary of the Security Council.

Dates of ranks

Awards 

 Azerbaijani Flag Order (December 24, 1998)

 Order of Merit of the Republic of Poland (1999)

See also 
 Ministers of Internal Affairs of Azerbaijan Republic
 Internal Troops of Azerbaijan

References

External links 

 Ministry of Internal Affairs of the Republic of Azerbaijan

1948 births
Living people
People from Khojaly District
Government ministers of Azerbaijan
Azerbaijani generals
Recipients of the Azerbaijani Flag Order